Aesma may refer to:
Aeshma, the Younger Avestan name of the demon of wrath in Zoroastrianism
Aesma Daeva (band)